Bom Futuro Municipal Airport  is the airport serving Lucas do Rio Verde, Brazil.

It is operated by the Municipality of Lucas do Rio Verde.

Airlines and destinations
No scheduled flights operate at this airport.

Access

See also

List of airports in Brazil

References

External links

Lucas do Rio Verde
Airports in Mato Grosso